The 1690 English general election occurred after the dissolution of the Convention Parliament summoned in the aftermath of the Glorious Revolution, and saw the partisan feuds in that parliament continue in the constituencies. The Tories made significant gains against their opponents, particularly in the contested counties and boroughs, as the electorate saw the Whigs increasingly as a source of instability and a threat to the Church of England.

Following the election, William continued his policy of forming a coalition government around non-partisan figures. The nominal leader of the new government was the Marquess of Carnarvon, though the Tories were able to use their greater numbers in the House of Commons to increase their share of government positions. Contests occurred in 103 constituencies, 38% of the total.

Party strengths are as estimated by the History of Parliament, though division lists for this parliament are not available and so a precise count may not be possible.

Summary of the constituencies
See 1796 British general election for details. The constituencies used in England and Wales were the same throughout the period. In 1707 alone the 45 Scottish members were not elected from the constituencies, but were returned by co-option of a part of the membership of the last Parliament of Scotland elected before the Union.

See also
 2nd Parliament of William and Mary
 List of parliaments of England

Notes

References

 Horwitz, Henry. “The General Election of 1690.” Journal of British Studies, vol. 11, no. 1, 1971, pp. 77–91. online

External links
 History of Parliament: Members 1690–1715
 History of Parliament: Constituencies 1690–1715

17th-century elections in Europe
1690 in politics
1690
General election